Mikkel Birkegaard is a Danish author of fantasy fiction. He lives in Copenhagen, Denmark.

Bibliography
  (2007; English translation by Tiina Nunnally: The Library of Shadows, 2009). Danish national bestseller. Seventeen foreign-language editions are in print or preparation.
 Over mit lig (2009; English translation by Steven T. Murray: Over My Dead Body, 2011)
 La librairie des ombres in French, Edited by

References
 Author's website
 Biography details
 Amazon UK listing of The Library of Shadows

Danish fantasy writers
1968 births
Living people